The 2020–21 season was Lori FC's third and final season in the Armenian Premier League, and they also participated in the Armenian Cup. Lori submitted their resignation from the league in April, with the remaining games being awarded as 3-0 technical defeats, leaving Lori in 8th in the League at the end of the season, whilst they were also knocked out of the Armenian Cup by BKMA Yerevan in the First Round.

Season events
On 4 August, Armen Sanamyan left his role as caretaker manager of Lori to become manager of Sevan. The following day, 5 August, Lori announced Albert Solomonov as their new head coach.

On 17 August, the Football Federation of Armenia announced that that day's match between Urartu and Lori would not take place as Lori still had players and staff in isolation following an outbreak of COVID-19.

On 20 August, Lori announced the signing of Arsen Yeghiazaryan from Urartu, and Manuel Vargas from Santos de Nasca, whilst Nana Antwi had returned from his loan spell with Lille B.

The following day, 21 August, Lori announced the signing of Timur Rudoselskiy from Kaisar, Aram Kocharyan from Gandzasar Kapan, and Almog Ohayon from Hapoel Petah Tikva.

On 22 August, Lori announced the signings of Vigen Avetisyan, Victor Cesar, Carlos Alberto Gutiérrez and Pavel Osipov.

On 24 August, the Football Federation of Armenia announced that that day's match between Van and Lori, and Lori's game against Gandzasar Kapan on 29 August had been postponed due to cases of COVID-19 within the Lori squad.

On 25 August, Lori announced the signing of Fernandinho from Cova da Piedade.

On 27 August, Vardan Shapperi moved to Ararat-Armenia.

On 28 August, Lori announced the singing of Karapet Manukyan from Lokomotiv Yerevan, and Arsen Siukayev from Tom Tomsk.

On 30 August, Lori announced the signing of Aleksandr Stepanov from Volgar Astrakhan.

On 31 August, Lori announced the signing of Muacir on a two-year contract from Amora.

On 2 September, Lori announced the signing of Hayk Sargsyan on a one-year contract, with the option of a second, from Lokomotiv Yerevan.

On 6 September, Lori announced the signing of Derenik Sargsyan to a two-year contract from Ararat-Armenia, and Artem Gomelko from Smolevichi to a one-year contract.

On 9 September, Lori announced the signing of Yevgeni Skoblikov on a one-year contract, from Belshina Bobruisk.

On 10 September, Lori announced the signings of Arman Asilyan from West Armenia, and Deou Dosa from Van.

On 11 September, Lori announced the signing of Naor Abudi to a one-year contract, with the option of a second, from Ashdod.

On 19 September, Lori announced the signing of Claudir to a one-year contract, with the option of a second, from Hapoel Ramat Gan Givatayim.

On 29 September, the season was suspended indefinitely due to the escalating 2020 Nagorno-Karabakh conflict. On 13 October, the FFA announced that the season would resume on 17 October.

On 15 October, Manuel Vargas left the club to return to Panama and sign with San Francisco.

On 17 October, Lori's match against Noah was postponed due to 7 positive COVID-19 cases within the Noah team. On the same day, Lori announced the singing of Ivan Božović to a one-year contract, with Pavel Kudryashov joining the next day on a similar contract.

On 13 January, Lori announced the departure of Hayk Sargsyan, Karapet Manukyan, Almog Ohayon, Deou Dosa, Naor Abudi, Anicet Oura, Pavel Kudryashov and Arsen Siukayev.

On 17 February, Lori announced the signing of Vardan Bakalyan, and Ghukas Poghosyan.

On 19 February, Lori announced the signings of Nemanja Šćekić, Luiz Matheus, Yevgeni Kirisov and Nikola Tripkovic.

On 24 February, Lori announced the signing of André Mensalão from Ferroviário.

On 2 March, Lori announced the signing of Nikola Popović from Metalac.

On 6 March, Lori announced the signing of Filip Kukuličić from Aluminij.

On 16 March, Lori walked off at the start of their match against Ararat Yerevan in protest of their Matchday 1 fixture being awarded to Urartu after Lori where unable to field a team due to COVID-19. With the match later being awarded to Ararat Yerevan 3–0.

On 5 April, Lori submitted their resignation from the 2020–21 Armenian Premier League.

Squad

Transfers

In

Out

Released

Friendlies

Competitions

Premier League

Results summary

Results by round

Results

Table

Armenian Cup

Statistics

Appearances and goals

|-
|colspan="14"|Players away on loan:
|-
|colspan="14"|Players who left Lori during the season:

|}

Goal scorers

Clean sheets

Disciplinary Record

References

Lori FC seasons
Lori